Donna Leon (born in Montclair, New Jersey) is the American author of a series of crime novels set in Venice, Italy, featuring the fictional hero Commissario Guido Brunetti. In 2003, she received the Corine Literature Prize.

Leon lived in Venice for over 30 years and now resides in the small village of Val Müstair in the mountains of Grisons in Switzerland. She also has a home in Zurich. In 2020 she became a Swiss citizen. She was a lecturer in English literature for the University of Maryland University CollegeEurope (UMUC-Europe) in Italy and taught English from 1981 to 1990 at an American military base in Italy. She has stopped teaching and concentrated on writing and other cultural activities in the field of music (especially baroque music).

Her Commissario Brunetti novels all take place in or around Venice. They are written in English and have been translated into many foreign languages, butat Leon's requestnot into Italian. The ninth Brunetti novel, Friends in High Places, won the Crime Writers' Association Silver Dagger in 2000. German television has produced 26 Commissario Brunetti episodes for broadcast.

Early life

Donna Leon was born to Catholic parents, who had strong leanings to the Democratic party. Her paternal grandparents were Spanish and her maternal grandparents were Irish and German. She grew up in Bloomfield, New Jersey. Her parents put a strong focus on education for their daughter.

The Guardian reports: "Leon was teaching in Iran while attempting to complete a PhD about Jane Austen when the revolution of 1978-79 interrupted her studies and her life. When her trunks were returned to her months later, following her hasty evacuation (part of it at gunpoint, on a bus), her papers were gone." She returned to the US and worked in New York City writing advertising copy. When she visited Italy for the first time, she fell in love with the country.

In 2015, she left Venice as her full-time home and began to split her time between the homes she owns in Switzerland, one in Zurich and another in the mountains. She returns to Venice approximately one week each month.

Career
Leon wrote a crime novel after seeing a scene she thought belonged in such a novel. She wrote it in 8 months and stuck it in a drawer until a friend persuaded her to submit to a writing contest, which she won.

Setting and viewpoints of the Brunetti novels
The police commissioner Guido Brunetti confronts crime in and around his home town of Venice. Each case is an opportunity for the author to reveal another aspect of the seamy underside of society and another facet of Venetian life. Brunetti reports to the vain and self-serving buffoon, Vice-Questore Patta, while Sergente (later Ispettore and with the inspector per tu) Vianello and the all-knowing and well-connected Signorina Elettra, Patta's secretary, assists Brunetti on the ground and through research.

These novels are successful in Germany and translated into many languages, except Italian.

Bibliography

Commissario Guido Brunetti novels

Other novels
 The Jewels of Paradise (2012)

Non-fiction

Books

Books with musical recordings
  Book and audio recording. WorldCat summary: "A literary, visual, and musical exploration of twelve of Handel's arias referencing animals. Complemented by a CD recording, conducted by Alan Curtis with Karina Gauvin (Soprano), Ann Hallenberg (Mezzo-soprano), Paul Agnew, and Anicio Zorzi Giustiniani (Tenor)."
  Book and audio recording. Worldcat summary: "Novelist Donna Leon recounts some legendary tales of Venice, offering insight into Venetian customs of the past and present. Includes music CD of seven concertos by Antonio Vivaldi performed by Il Complesso Barocco and conducted by Riccardo Minasi."
  Book and audio recording.  Worldcat summary: "Accompanied by a CD of Italian boat songs, this fascinating history of the gondola, which was first used in medieval Venice as a maneuverable getaway boat, reveals how it evolved over the centuries into a floating pleasure palace that facilitated the romantic escapades of the Venetian elite." Notes: "With a CD of Venetian barcarole performed by Il Pomo d'Oro, conducted by Riccardo Minasi, featuring Vincenzo Capezzuto and Cecilia Bartoli."

Spin-offs
Leon's Commissario Brunetti novels have spawned multiple spin-off enterprises, including:

 A travel guidebook:  
Walking Tours of Guido Brunetti's Venice with accompanying maps: Dr. Toni Sepeda,"the only lecturer authorized by Donna Leon to conduct events in Brunetti's Venicea", leads individual and group tours of the locations and routes noted in Leon's Commissario Guido Brunetti novels.

References

Further reading

External links 

 Interview with Donna Leon and links to more Donna Leon interviews.
Il Complesso Barocco, official website  of conductor/harpsichordist/founder Alan Curtis' Baroque-music orchestra underwritten by Donna Leon.

Living people
20th-century American novelists
21st-century American novelists
American crime fiction writers
University of Maryland Global Campus faculty
People from Montclair, New Jersey
American expatriates in Italy
American women novelists
Women mystery writers
Novelists from New Jersey
Novelists from Maryland
20th-century American women writers
21st-century American women writers
Year of birth missing (living people)